The Provisional Constitutional Order, popularly known as PCO, is an emergency and extra-constitutional order that suspends either wholly or partially the Constitution of Pakistan — the supreme law of the land.

The PCO fulfills and acts as the temporary order while the constitution is held in abeyance or suspension. Mostly, the orders have been enforced during the times of martial law imposed by the armed forces of the country against the civilian governments.

Overview of Provisional Constitutional Order

Provisional Constitutional Order, 1981

Soon after the martial law went into immediate effect in 1977, the Constitution of Pakistan was suspended. The first PCO was declared on 24 March 1981 by then-President and chief of army staff General Zia-ul-Haq.

Under this new order, the senior Justice of the Supreme Court of Pakistan were asked to take an oath of office under the provisions set by the PCO. In March 1981, President Zia terminated 19 senior Justices of the Supreme Court when they refused to take the oath. Chief Justice Dorab Patel and Senior Justice Fakhruddin G. Ebrahim declined to take the oath; thus opting for retirement. Senior Justice Anwarul Haq also resigned after refusing to take the oath whilst the Senior Justice Mushtaq Hussain, who was willing to take the oath, was not asked to do so.

Senior Justices Hussain and Haq had previously approved Zulfikar Ali Bhutto's hanging were reportedly restrained to take an oath under the secretive directives issued by President Zia. All of these Senior Justices were asked to tender their resignation, which they did.

Provisional Constitutional Order, 1999

In the wake of political tensions arising after the border incidents with India that nearly pushed the two countries to the brink of war, Chairman Joint Chiefs of Staff Committee and Chief of Army Staff General Pervez Musharraf immediately imposed martial law against the government of Prime Minister Nawaz Sharif on 12 October 1999.

General Musharraf effectively imposed a state of emergency and suspended the Constitution after introducing the Provisional Order. Nearly, all Senior Justices were forcefully required to take an oath of office under this new order, and concerns were raised that this would "erode the independence of the judiciary".

Provisional Constitutional Order, 2007

In 2007, another Provisional Constitutional Order was issued by General Pervez Musharraf. The PCO was issued on 3 November 2007 and was later amended on 15 November 2007. It was lifted on 16 December 2007.

References

Constitution of Pakistan
Political terminology in Pakistan
Military terminology of Pakistan
Legal history of Pakistan
Continuity of government in Pakistan